This is a list of Polish television related events from 2016.

Events
13 May - Na dobre i na złe actress Anna Karczmarczyk and her partner Jacek Jeschke win the eighteenth series of Taniec z Gwiazdami.

Television shows

1990s
Klan (1997–present)

2000s
M jak miłość (2000–present)
Na Wspólnej (2003–present)
Pierwsza miłość (2004–present)
Dzień Dobry TVN (2005–present)
Taniec z gwiazdami (2005-2011, 2014–present)
Mam talent! (2008–present)

2010s
The Voice of Poland (2011–present)
X Factor (2011–present)

Deaths

See also
2016 in Poland